Jeff Smith (born March 22, 1962) is a former professional American football player who played running back for four seasons for the Kansas City Chiefs and Tampa Bay Buccaneers in the National Football League (NFL). His most productive season was 1986 with the Chiefs when he gained 1270 all-purpose yards, 557 of which came returning kickoffs. Smith's college career was highlighted by his two touchdowns in the 1984 Orange Bowl including one in the last minute to almost rally the Nebraska Cornhuskers to a comeback victory against the Miami Hurricanes in what is still thought to be one of the greatest college football games of all time.

After his NFL career Smith has pursued a career in the criminal justice system, working as a Court Services Officer in Wichita, Kansas.

Smith is the step-father of NFL running back Breece Hall.

References

External links
 Football Database bio

1962 births
Living people
Players of American football from Wichita, Kansas
American football running backs
Nebraska Cornhuskers football players
Kansas City Chiefs players
Tampa Bay Buccaneers players
Probation and parole officers